Handsome Boy Modeling School is an American collaborative project between hip hop producers Dan the Automator (Gorillaz, Dr. Octagon, Deltron 3030) and Prince Paul (Stetsasonic, De La Soul, Gravediggaz). The collaboration originally lasted from 1999 to 2006 and resulted in two albums, featuring a vast cast of guest rappers, singers, comedians and DJs. In February 2018, the duo played a concert in New York City.

History
Handsome Boy Modeling School was a conceptual hip hop duo that parodied and acted as a commentary on vain, consumerist, materialistic, and self-absorbed members of upper class society, such as supermodels and people from old money. The pair often satirized upper class snobbery and perceived beauty.

In 1999, they released the concept album So... How's Your Girl?, which was loosely based on "The Prettiest Week of My Life", an episode of the sitcom Get a Life which starred Chris Elliott. The episode also contains the origin of the name Handsome Boy Modeling School, where Chris Elliott's character enrolls to become a male model. In the album, Dan and Paul assume the characters of Nathaniel Merriweather and Chest Rockwell, respectively. The Rockwell name is in reference to a pseudonym used by a porn star in 1997 film Boogie Nights; the Merriweather name is likely an homage to the character Nathanial Mayweather, also played by Chris Elliott, in the 1994 comedic feature Cabin Boy. Dan the Automator continued to use the pseudonym Nathaniel Merriweather alongside Mike Patton and Jennifer Charles for the collaborative project Lovage.

A number of guest musicians appear, including Róisín Murphy (one half of the duo Moloko at the time of the album's release), DJ Shadow, Del the Funky Homosapien, J-Live, Sean Lennon, Miho Hatori (of Cibo Matto), Mike D (of the Beastie Boys) and Don Novello (as comic character Father Guido Sarducci).

Their 1999 single "The Projects" in collaboration with Dave of De La Soul and Del the Funky Homosapien was featured in the 2001 film Ocean's Eleven.

Their second album, White People, was released in November 2004. Some collaborators from the first album returned, and new collaborators included RZA, Cat Power, Casual, Alex Kapranos of Franz Ferdinand, Chester Bennington and Mike Shinoda of Linkin Park, Jack Johnson, Cedric Bixler-Zavala of The Mars Volta, Mike Patton, El-P, Pharrell, John Oates, Chino Moreno, Lord Finesse, Black Sheep, and comedy actor Tim Meadows.

In 2006, Prince Paul announced his retirement from Handsome Boy Modeling School due to business conflicts with Dan the Automator. However, the duo reunited to play a concert hosted by Saks Fifth Avenue, New York City, on 14 February 2018. According to HipHopDX, they announced plans to release a new album at the performance. On 9 April 2022, at a show in Portland, Oregon, Dan the Automator officially announced that a third album was in the works, predicting a fall 2022 release which did not come to pass.

Discography

Albums

Singles

References

External links
 

American hip hop groups
Atlantic Records artists
Elektra Records artists
American musical duos
Hip hop duos
Musical groups established in 1999
Musical groups disestablished in 2006
Musical groups reestablished in 2018
Tommy Boy Records artists
1999 establishments in the United States